William Capell may refer to:

William Capel (died 1515), Lord Mayor of London
William Capell, 3rd Earl of Essex (1697–1743), 3rd Earl of Essex
William Capell, 4th Earl of Essex (1732–1799), 4th Earl of Essex
William Capel (sportsman) (1775–1854), sportsman and priest
William Jennings Capell (born 1953), American heir presumptive to the earldom of Essex

See also
William Kapell, pianist